Venice was started in Venice, California in 1977 by cousins Michael Lennon (born 17 July 1959) and Kipp Lennon (born 12 March 1960).  Michael's brother Mark (born 28 March 1963) joined the band in 1978, followed by Kipp's brother Pat (born 9 November 1951) in 1980. Kipp and Pat are two of eleven siblings, and are younger brothers of the Lennon Sisters. Michael and Mark are two of thirteen siblings.

Members of Venice have performed alongside, or recorded with, Bruce Springsteen, Don Henley, Elton John, Heart, Phil Collins, Sting, Melissa Etheridge, Cher, Ozzy Osbourne, Jackson Browne, David Crosby, Stevie Nicks, Billy Idol, Michael McDonald, Dave Mason, Tim Moyer, Chris Isaak, Robin Beck, Kenny Loggins, the Doobie Brothers, Styx, Brian Wilson, the Beach Boys, Dolly Parton, Linda Ronstadt, Bon Jovi, 
Michael Ruff, Warren Zevon and Dutch band Yellow Pearl. Tano Costa, the band's original drummer, is the son of the late music arranger and record producer Don Costa, who arranged and produced for Frank Sinatra, Paul Anka and many other recordings artists in the 1950s and 1960s jazz and pop era.

In 1993, Venice shared the stage with Iron Maiden lead singer Bruce Dickinson in Jingu Stadium, Tokyo. 

Venice has been featured nationally on such television programs as Entertainment Tonight, Access Hollywood, E! News Daily, CNN's Showbiz Today, Live with Regis and Kathie Lee, The Jerry Lewis Telethon and Rick Dees' Into the Night.

To date, Venice has found their biggest success in The Netherlands. In 2003, the band won an Edison Award (the Dutch version of the Grammy) for Best International Artist, beating out superstars U2 and Coldplay. In that country, Venice's singles are a mainstay on radio, their tours sell out consistently, and they've been guests on countless television programs, most notably Two Meter Sessies, a popular prime-time program that has devoted three entire half-hour episodes to the band; the "Venice - 2 Meter Sessies" CD has gone gold.

The backing vocal duties on Roger Waters "The Wall Live Tour" from September 15, 2010 - September 21, 2013 (219 total performances) The Wall Live are being carried out by Venice's Kipp, Mark and Pat Lennon (who replaced Michael following vocal difficulties exhibited during pre-tour rehearsals). Portions of this tour were captured for the film "Roger Waters The Wall" which was released theatrically worldwide on September 29, 2015.

Mark Lennon performed new backing vocals to the controversial 2002 reissue of the 1980 Ozzy Osbourne album Blizzard of Ozz. The album also featured re-recorded bass and drum parts, much to the displeasure of Osbourne's longtime fans.

Members
The members of Venice are:
 Kipp Lennon - lead vocals, percussion 
 Mark Lennon - lead vocals
 Michael Lennon - electric & acoustic guitar, vocals
 Pat Lennon - electric & acoustic guitar, vocals

Others who have performed with Venice include:
Michael Boehle - percussion
Martijn Bosman - drums
Nick Bult - keyboards 
Tano Costa - drums
Scott Crago - drums / percussion
Dann Gillen - drums
André Kemp - drums
Mark Harris - bass guitar
Chris Horvath - keyboards
Monroe Jones - keyboards
Matt Laug - drums / percussion
Ron Manaog - drums
Rich Mangicaro - percussion
Paul Mirkovich - keyboards
Bob Philipse - drums
Kevin Ricard - percussion
Alexis Sklarevski - bass 
John Vester - acoustic guitar
Jasper Westerhof - keyboards
Jamie Wollam - drums

Albums
 2019 - Jacaranda Street (Lennon Records)
 2017 - Waves of Christmas - (Lennon Records)
 2017 - Into the Morning Blue - (Lennon Records)
 2016 - Brunch Buffet - Tasty Covers (Lennon Records)
 2015 - Lucky 7 Part 1 - (Lennon Records)
 2013 - What Summer Brings - double album (Lennon Records)
 2009 - Electric - Live and Amplified (Lennon Records)
 2008 - Venice Home Grown (CD/DVD combo) 
 2007 - Garage Demos Part III (self-released)
 2006 - Amsterdam (Universal/Flow)
 2006 - A Band Called Venice (Flow/Japan)
 2004 - Pacific Standard Time (Flow)
 2002 - Welcome To the Rest of Your Life (Columbia)
 2000 - 2 Meter Sessies (Universal)
 1999 - Spin Art (Vanguard)
 1999 - Christmas With Venice (self-released)
 1997 - Born and Raised (Vanguard)
 1995 - Garage Demos Part I (self-released)
 1995 - Garage Demos Part II (self-released)
 1990 - Venice (album/CD) (Modern/Atlantic)
 1986 - Do It Yourself (self-released LP)

DVDs
 Venice Live (At The Royal Carre Theatre)
 Blue Paint (Music Video)
 2 meter sessions (Harderwijk 1998 and Los Angeles 1999)

References

External links
Venice The Band - Venice Official Website
Venice's Facebook page
 Interview with Michael Lennon on Yuzu Melodies

Rock music groups from California
Musical groups established in 1977